Adinandra integerrima is a species of plant in the Pentaphylacaceae family. It is found in Malaysia and Singapore. It is threatened by habitat loss.

References

integerrima
Flora of Peninsular Malaysia
Flora of Singapore
Conservation dependent plants
Near threatened flora of Asia
Taxonomy articles created by Polbot